Anna-Lena Axelsson (born 1956) is a Swedish orienteering competitor. She won a bronze medal in the relay event at the 1979 World Orienteering Championships in Tampere, together with Karin Rabe and Monica Andersson.

References

1956 births
Living people
Swedish orienteers
Female orienteers
Foot orienteers
World Orienteering Championships medalists